, born on August 4, 1994 in Tokyo, Japan, is a Japanese actress who made her debut in 1998. She is contracted to talent agency FLaMme.

Her father, Kenji Fukuda, is a drummer in the band Kasutera.

Filmography

Television dramas 
 Summer Snow (TBS) (2000)
 Yoiko no Mikata (NTV) (2003)
 Ai no Ie (NHK) (2003)
 Hikari to Tomo ni... -Jiheijōshi o Kakaete- (NTV) (2004)
 Last Present: Musume to Ikiru Saigo no Natsu (NTV) (2004)
 Honto ni atta Kowai no Hanashi (2004, CX)
 Emergency room 24hours 3 (2005, CX)
 The Queen's Classroom (Joō no Kyōshitsu) (2005, NTV)
 Hotaru no Haka (2005, NTV)
 Byakuyakō [Journey Under the Midnight Sun] (2006, TBS)
 Teru Teru Ashita (2006, EX)
 Chibi Maruko-chan (2006, CX)
 Saikai: Yokota Megumi-san no Negai (2006, NTV)
 Sono Gofun Mae (2006, NHK)
 Enka no Joō (2007, NTV)
 Serendipity no Kiseki (2007, NTV)
 Matsumoto Kisaburō Ikka Monogatari: Ojiisan no Daidokoro (2007, CX)
 Arigatou! Champy (2008, CX)
 Kiri no Hi (2008, NHK)
 Soka, Mo Kimi wa Inai no ka (2009, TBS)
 Zettai Reido (2010, CX, episode 5)
 Miporin no Ekubo (2010, NTV) (2010)
 Q10 (2010, NTV) (2010)
 Soredemo, Ikite Yuku (2011, CX) (2011)
 Pandora 3 (2011, WOWOW)
 Future Diary (2012, TBS)
 Scarlet (2019–20, NHK)

 Television variety shows Sujinashi (BSN, TBC, NBC) (2006)

Movies 
 Kamikaze Girls (2004)
 Tenshi no Aeba (2004)
 Onaji Tsuki o Miteiru (2005)
 Gimmy Heaven (2006)
 Japan Sinks (2006)
 Yūnagi (2006)
 Little DJ: Chiisana Koi no Monogatari (2007)
 L: Change the World (2008) as Maki Nikaido
 10 Promises to My Dog (2008)
 Heaven's Door (2009)
 Goemon (2009)
 Sakura, Futatabi no Kanako (2013) as Masami
 Flare (2014) as Flare Mitsui
 Kamata Prelude (2020)
 Good-bye (2021) as Sakura

Anime 
Piano no Mori (2007)
Mai Mai Miracle (2009)

Stage 
Ame to yume no ato ni (2006)
"Iya mushiro wasurete gusa" (2013)

Video 
Eri Tanenaka's PV "gerbera" (theme song of Gimmy Heaven)

Advertisements

TV commercials

2003 
 Nippon Telegraph and Telephone East Corporation (January)
 Zega Toys (March)

2004 
 QUOQ Inc. (January)
 Kellogg Corn Flake (June)
 Nihon Kentucky Fried Chicken (December)

2005 
 Acecook (March)

2006 
 Hoosiers (April – present)

2012 
 Olympics 2012

Voice-over work 
 Charlotte's Web – Fern Arable (Dakota Fanning)

Personal life
Mayuko's interests include reading and handicraft, and she can also play the piano. Her favourite artists includes Ayumi Hamasaki, Porno Graffitti and Shiina Ringo.

References

External links 
  
 

1994 births
Japanese child actresses
Living people
People from Tokyo
Japanese voice actresses
Rikkyo University alumni